Yong (Nyong) is a Southwestern Tai language of Thailand. It is used by Tai Yong people, who are descended from Tai Lue people from Xishuangbanna, China and Kengtung, Myanmar. Ethnologue reports that Yong is phonologically similar to the Tai Lue language. Most Yong speakers are multilingual and speak Northern Thai and Standard Thai. There were 12,600 speakers as of 2000.

Distribution
Yong is spoken in San Kamphaeng District, Chiang Mai Province, and Pa Sang District, Mae Tha District, and Mueang Lamphun District, Lamphun Province (Ethnologue).

Phonology
 

Yong has six tones: mid-rising, mid, low, high, mid-falling and high-falling. As of 2019, there appears to be a generational change occurring where the high tone is merged with the high- and mid-falling tones due to language contact with Northern Thai and Standard Thai.

Further reading
Wangsai, Piyawat. 2007. A Comparative Study of Phonological Yong and Northern Thai Language (Kammuang). M.A. thesis. Kasetsart University.

References

Southwestern Tai languages